The San Antonio River is a major waterway in Texas, United States.

San Antonio River may also refer to:

 San Antonio River (California), in Monterey County, California, United States
 San Antonio River (Mexico)
 San Antonio River (South America), forming part of the border between Argentina and Brazil
 San Antonio River (Peru), in Rodríguez de Mendoza Province
 Rio San Antonio (Colorado–New Mexico)